Vallepietra is a comune (municipality) in the Metropolitan City of Rome in the Italian region Lazio, located about  east of Rome, in the Monti Simbruini area.

Vallepietra borders the following municipalities: Camerata Nuova, Cappadocia, Filettino, Jenne, Subiaco, Trevi nel Lazio.

Main sights
Sanctuary of the Santissima Trinità, probably a rock settlement from the Neolithic era, and later a place of popular adoration connected to the Benedictine abbeys in Subiaco. It is still today the end of pilgrimages, often led by feet. The object of the popular adoration is a fresco portraying the Trinity, dating probably from the 12th century, and which has strong Byzantine influences.

References

External links
 Official website

Cities and towns in Lazio